Pennsylvanian may refer to:

 A person or thing from Pennsylvania
 Pennsylvanian (geology), a geological subperiod of the Carboniferous Period
 Pennsylvanian (train), an Amtrak train